Chilo pulverosellus is a species of moth in the family Crambidae described by Émile Louis Ragonot in 1895. It is found across southern Europe, France,  as well as in the Levant region, and in the region of Transcaspia.

The forewing length is around 11–13 mm. The ground colour of the forewings is white to cream, variably dusted with brown scales. The hindwings are silky white or cream. Adults have wings from May to September. There are probably two or three generations per year.

The larvae feed on corn.

References

Moths described in 1895
Chiloini
Moths of Europe
Moths of Asia